Kaplan Zaurbechevich Khuako (born 17 April 1977) is a Russian professional football coach and a former player. He is the general director for FC Druzhba Maykop.

Club career
He made his debut in the Russian Premier League in 2007 for PFC Spartak Nalchik.

Personal life
His sons Tagir Khuako and Temir Khuako are now professional footballers.

References

1977 births
People from Maykop
Living people
Russian footballers
Association football defenders
PFC Spartak Nalchik players
Russian Premier League players
FC Metallurg Lipetsk players
FC SKA-Khabarovsk players
Sportspeople from Adygea